Darbhanga Lok Sabha constituency is one of the 40 Lok Sabha (parliamentary) constituencies in Bihar state in eastern India. Currently Gopal Jee Thakur of Bhartiya Janta Party is the Member of Parliament from Darbhanga Loksabha.

Assembly segments
From 2009 Lok Sabha elections, Darbhanga Lok Sabha constituency comprises the following six Vidhan Sabha (legislative assembly) segments:

Members of Parliament

^ by poll

Election results

See also 
 Darbhanga district
 List of Constituencies of the Lok Sabha

References

Lok Sabha constituencies in Bihar
Politics of Darbhanga district